Heraclides Lembus (Hērakleidēs Lembos) was an Ancient Greek statesman, historian and philosophical writer.

Heraclides was an Egyptian civil servant who lived during the reign of Ptolemy VI Philometor (2nd century BC).
The Suda mentions a Heraclides of Oxyrhynchus, but according to Diogenes Laërtius he originated from Callatis or Alexandria.
He was the son of a man named Sarapion ('Lembus' is a nickname meaning 'cockboat').

He is said to have negotiated the treaty that ended Antiochus IV's invasion of Egypt in 169 BC.
That Agatharchides of Cnidus became known by being his secretary is further evidence to his importance in the Ptolemaic administration.

Works
His works (mainly excerpts and epitomes from earlier writers) survive only in fragments.

 Histories (Ἱστορίαι) in at least 37 books. The extant fragments discuss the following topics: a frog plague in Paeonia and Dardania; Demetrius Poliorcetes and his father Antigonus Monophthalmus in love with the courtesan Demo; philological eccentricities concerning Alexarchus, the brother of Cassander inventing words. Traditionally, two further fragments are attributed to the Histories on the foundation of Rome by Greeks returning from the Trojan war and on the Spartan king Archidamus II; however, these might actually belong to Heraclides' epitome of Aristotle's Constitutions. An epitome was, presumably, made by Hero of Athens, a rhetor tentatively dated to the first century AD.
 Lembeutikos Logos (Λεμβευτικὸς λόγος), about which nothing is known, apart from an obscure connection to his nickname.
 an epitome of Sotion's Successions of Philosophers.
 an epitome of Satyrus' Lives. 
 an epitome of Hermippus's On Lawgivers, On the Seven Sages and On Pythagoras. 
 excerpts from an epitome of Aristotle's Constitutions and Barbarian Customs (Νόμιμα βαρβαρικά). The fragments of these largely lost works (only the Constitution of the Athenians (Aristotle) extant) were published in 1847 as Heraclidis politiarum quae extant, by F. G. Schneidewin.
 a biography of Archimedes (doubtful), mentioned by Eutocius.

Criticism
As a historian Heraclides has been discounted, as the selection criteria in his epitome of Aristotle's Constitutions show a certain inclination towards the weird and sensational, e.g.:

His prime merit lies in the faithful transmission of otherwise lost sources (e.g. the missing first part of the Constitution of the Athenians).

The Histories were, presumably, criticised by Dionysius of Halicarnassus in The Arrangement of Words with regard to his Asiatic style.

Notes

References
Mervin R. Dilts, Heraclidis Lembi. Excerpta Politiarum (1971), editor and translator M. R. D. (Greek, Roman and Byzantine Studies Monographs no. 5)
Miroslav Marcovich, Heraclidis Lembi Excerpta Politiarum, The American Journal of Philology, Vol. 96, No. 1 (Spring, 1975), pp. 16–18
C. Müller, Fragmenta Historicorum Graecorum (1841–1870) 2, 197-224 (Constitutions, wrongly attributed to Heraclides Ponticus) and 3, 167-171.
Rudolf Daebritz, "Herakleides Lembos (51)". Realencyclopädie der classischen Altertumswissenschaft VIII,1 (1945) Sp. 488-491.

External links 
Suda On Line, Ἡρακλείδης
Dilts (1971), Greek, Roman and Byzantine Studies via the website of the Duke University Libraries

2nd-century BC writers
Ancient Greek biographers
Hellenistic-era philosophers from Africa
Ptolemaic court